Lee Jong-woo (born 7 July 1985) is a speed skater who competes for South Korea.

Career

At the 2006 Winter Olympics in Turin he finished 14th overall in the 1500 with a time of 1:48.11. At the 2010 Winter Olympics in Vancouver he finished 22nd overall in the 1500 with a time of 1:49.00.

Personal bests

Last updated 20 February 2010.

References

External links
 Lee Jong-Woo's profile, from http://www.vancouver2010.com; retrieved 2010-02-20.
Lee Jong-Woo's profile from speedskatingbase.eu
Lee Jong-Woo's career results

1985 births
Living people
South Korean male speed skaters
Olympic speed skaters of South Korea
Speed skaters at the 2006 Winter Olympics
Speed skaters at the 2010 Winter Olympics
Speed skaters at the 2007 Asian Winter Games